Streptomyces litoralis is a bacterium species from the genus of Streptomyces which has been isolated from the beach of Awat in China.

See also
 List of Streptomyces species

References

External links
Type strain of Streptomyces litoralis at BacDive -  the Bacterial Diversity Metadatabase

litoralis
Bacteria described in 2016